Caliris is a genus of mantises in the family Haaniidae. Species in this genus are found in Asia.

Species
The following species are recognised in the genus Caliris: lists:
 Caliris elegans Giglio-Tos, 1915
 Caliris masoni Westwood, 1889 - type species
 Caliris melli Beier, 1933
 Caliris pallens Wang, 1993
 Caliris pallida (Werner, 1935)

References

External links 
Photo on GBIF
Photo of Caliris elegans on Project Noah
 

Tarachodidae
Mantodea genera